Hubie and Bertie are animated cartoon rodent characters in the Warner Bros. Looney Tunes and Merrie Melodies series of cartoons. Hubie and Bertie represent some of animator Chuck Jones' earliest work that was intended to be funny rather than cute. Seven Hubie and Bertie cartoons were produced between 1943 and 1952.

Debut
Jones introduced Hubie and Bertie in the short The Aristo-Cat, first released on June 19, 1943. The plot of the cartoon would serve as the template for most future Hubie/Bertie outings: a character with some mental illness or degree of naïveté (here, a cat who doesn't know what a mouse looks like) is psychologically tormented by the pair. They tell the hungry cat that he is a lion and a bulldog his prey, leading to several painful encounters for the cat.

Hubie and Bertie as designed by Jones are nearly identical rodents (Hubie, a rat and Bertie, a mouse) with long snouts, large ears, and big, black noses. The two are anthropomorphic, walking on their stubby hind legs and using their forelimbs as arms. They are primarily distinguished by their color: one is brown with a lighter-colored belly and face, while the other is gray. Hubie has a Brooklyn accent ("Hey, Boit! C'mere!"). Bertie has large buck teeth, and a habit of responding to Hubie with "Yeah-yeah, sure-sure!" or snickering "Riot!" if Hubie has just proposed some scheme with comic potential.

Mel Blanc voiced Hubie. While historians differ on who voiced Bertie in the initial cartoon, Stan Freberg voiced him subsequently.

Development
Bertie made a cameo in Odor-able Kitty.

Trap Happy Porky (February 24, 1945) was their second appearance. Nameless, indistinguishable except for color, they appear only in the first act, stealing food from Porky in nightshirt and cap. They are silent except for a single "I'm only three and a half years old", and retreat when a cat shows up.

Jones would repeat the theme of mind games several more times in his Hubie and Bertie shorts, as in their third cartoon, Roughly Squeaking on November 23, 1946. This time, Jones has the mice exploit a cat's stupidity by convincing him he is a lion and a dog is a moose he wants to eat. By the short's end, the cat thinks he is a lion, the dog believes he is a pelican, and a bystanding bird (driven mad from watching the two) has pulled his feathers out and imagines himself a Thanksgiving turkey. The mice are here voiced by Dick Nelson (Hubie) and Stan Freberg (Bertie).

The short was followed by House Hunting Mice on September 6, 1947, where Hubie and Bertie run afoul of a housekeeping robot.

In the next cartoon, Mouse Wreckers, and for the remainder of the series, Blanc and Freberg would handle the voices of Hubie and Bertie, respectively.

Cat and mouse
Jones introduced a permanent "antagonist" of sorts for the mice in Mouse Wreckers. The short was released in 1949 and was the first in which they are officially called "Hubie" and "Bertie". In the cartoon, the duo moves into a new home, only to discover that it is protected by champion mouser Claude Cat (the character's debut), voiced by Mel Blanc. The mice torment the cat both physically and mentally. The short was nominated for an Academy Award.

The mice would antagonize Claude in two more films: The Hypo-Chondri-Cat, released in 1950, featured Hubie and Bertie making Claude think he is sick with various ailments and, ultimately, that he has died. In 1951's Cheese Chasers, however, Hubie and Bertie inadvertently torment Claude when, after going overboard on a cheese raid and getting sick of their favorite food, they decide to commit suicide by trying to get Claude to eat them, but Claude thinks that they are poisonous and refuses, deciding to commit suicide as well by getting a bulldog to attack him but the bulldog gets confused.

After these seven cartoons, Jones retired Hubie and Bertie, but continued to use the characters (or mice resembling them) in cameo roles in other shorts whenever he needed a generic mouse for a gag, such as the unnamed mouse in Chow Hound, who resembles Bertie, or the "killer" mice in Scaredy Cat.

Filmography
 The Aristo-Cat (1943)
 Trap Happy Porky (1945)
 Roughly Squeaking (1946)
 House Hunting Mice (1947)
 Mouse Wreckers (1949)
 The Hypo-Chondri-Cat (1950)
 Cheese Chasers (1951)

Later appearances
Hubie and Bertie have made several cameos and recurring appearances in various Warner Bros. productions:
 Hubie and Bertie were going to have a cameo in Who Framed Roger Rabbit, but were later dropped for unknown reasons.
 They also appeared in Tiny Toon Adventures.
 Hubie and Bertie appear in The Sylvester & Tweety Mysteries.
 In the 1996 movie Space Jam, Hubie and Bertie play the public address announcers during the basketball game where Michael Jordan and the Looney Tunes compete against the MonStars. Bertie's announcer voice was provided by Steve Kehela.
 Hubie and Bertie made a cameo in Tweety's High-Flying Adventure.
 Hubie and Bertie appear in the Duck Dodgers episode "Too Close for Combat." They are hired by Queen Tyr'Ahnee and Martian Commander X-2 to break up Duck Dodgers and the Eager Young Space Cadet with their vocal impersonations of them. It nearly worked until Duck Dodgers and Cadet discovered them. They managed to persuade Hubie and Bertie into using their tricks on Queen Tyr'Ahnee and Martian Commander X-2.
 Hubie and Bertie briefly appear in The Looney Tunes Show opening.
 Hubie and Bertie appear in the New Looney Tunes segments "Appropriate Technology", "Daffy the Stowaway", "Tweet Team", "Darkbat", "Bonjour, Darkbat!", "Smoothie Operator".
 Hubie and Bertie have also appeared in some video games.
 Hubie is seen alone in the Bugs Bunny: Lost in Time level "The Carrot Factory".
 Both can be seen in the Space Jam video game.
 Hubie and Bertie made appearances in the HBO Max series Looney Tunes Cartoons starring in shorts such as "Happy Birthday, Bugs Bunny!" and "Frame the Feline".
 Hubie and Bertie appeared in Bugs Bunny Builders, but as females, with them going by the names Ruthie and Gertie.

Home media
All of the Hubie and Bertie cartoons are available, remastered, on Looney Tunes Mouse Chronicles: The Chuck Jones Collection on DVD and Blu-Ray.

References

External links
 All about Hubie and Bertie on Chuck Jones' Official Website.

Fictional mice and rats
Fictional tricksters
Looney Tunes characters
Male characters in animation
Film characters introduced in 1943
Fictional anthropomorphic characters
Animated duos